Tasteful Licks Records is an independent artist-run record label in Raleigh, North Carolina. Tasteful Licks, also referred to as TLr, is a wholly owned subsidiary of Remedy Media Group. The name is derived from the musician's term for a quick and sudden improvisation done in such a way as not to distract from the melody or overall rhythm. The managing member for Tasteful Licks is Jason Mosby.

History

Tasteful Licks Records was founded by Remedy Media Group in 2005. As with all RMG subsidiaries, Tasteful Licks was constructed as an independent ‘productization’ of consolidated Remedy services and capabilities. Being primarily artist run, the label is known for their emphasis on artist development, a concentration on the profile, professionalism, and longevity of an artist’s career, rather than product development which focuses on the monetization of individual releases.

Recent

In the first quarter of 2010, Tasteful Licks announced that it would no longer manufacture and distribute compact discs for its artist works, instead producing multi-media USB memory cards with music, videos, photos, interviews, and other additional content.

Artists (past and present)
 Antithesis
 DJ Jamad
 Floyd the Locsmif
 Frequency Benders Incorporated
 JLaine
 Mono/Poly
 Next Time Gadget
 Panacea
 Rasta Root
 TFox
 Wes Felton
 Zo!

Selected discography
 JLaine – Apple Jons  (TLR-1001, 2007)
 Next.Time.Gadget – Bit[r] (TLR-0101, 2007)
 DJ Jamad - Afromatic (TLR-0301, 2008)
 Wes Felton – Distraction City (TLR-1101, 2008)
 Panacea – A Mind on a Ship Through Time (TLR-1501, 2008)
 TFox - The Great Junction (2010)

References

External links 
 Official website

American independent record labels